Les Maîtres du temps (lit. The Masters of Time, a.k.a. Time Masters; Herrscher der Zeit in German; Az idő urai in Hungarian) is a 1982 Franco-West German-Swiss-British-Hungarian animated science fiction feature film directed by René Laloux and designed by Mœbius. It is based on the 1958 science fiction novel L'Orphelin de Perdide (The Orphan of Perdide) by Stefan Wul.

The film centres on a boy, Piel, who is stranded on Perdide, a desert planet where giant killer hornets live. He awaits rescue by the space pilot Jaffar, the exiled prince Matton, his sister Belle and Jaffar's old friend Silbad who are trying to reach Perdide and save Piel before it is too late.

Plot 
A man named Claude is driving a vehicle across the planet Perdide. He sends a message to his friend Jaffar, telling him that his wife Annie was killed by indigenous monster hornets. After a crash wrecks his vehicle and he cannot extricate himself, he lets his son Piel down from the wreckage and hands him an ovoid interstellar transceiver, telling him that it is named "Mike" and will talk to him, and to do whatever Mike tells him to do. After Claude sends his son to the Dolongs, a nearby coral-like forest which repulses the hornets, the crashed vehicle explodes.

On his spaceship Double Triangle 22, Jaffar receives Claude's last message. Before heading for Perdide, he decides to seek out his friend Silbad, as Silbad has experience in living on Perdide. Jaffar's passengers, Prince Matton and his sister, Princess Belle, have been deposed from their planet; they bring with them a treasure the Prince took along to fund his restoration. Matton is not at all happy about being diverted and makes no attempt to hide his displeasure. At the same time, a relationship begins to blossom between Jaffar and Belle.

Jaffar, Silbad, Matton and Belle begin communicating with Piel to give him advice. Whilst on Silbad's planet, they witness the metamorphosis of a water lily-like organism into dozens of empathic, sentient, primary-colored homunculi, two of whom, named Yula and Jad, stow away on Jaffar's spacecraft seeking adventure. Unknown to the Prince, Yula and Jad play with and then dispose of the treasure via the airlock. When Matton speaks with Piel, he nearly convinces the trusting boy to drown himself in a lake, but is discovered by Belle, who stuns him and talks Piel to safety.

Jaffar plans to use the gravitational pull of the Blue Comet to reach Perdide. In order to rendezvous with it, Jaffar pilots his craft to the planet Gamma 10. Prince Matton escapes in a shuttlecraft to the surface of Gamma 10, which is inhabited by faceless, identical white angels. They capture both Matton and Jaffar, who followed in a space lifeboat, and intend to throw them into the living, thinking amorphous being which controls the planet. Although they are unable to rescue Jaffar, Yula and Jad are able to forewarn him: As they contact the controlling being, its victims get dominated by it, lose all sense of individuality and become one of the faceless angels. They instruct Jaffar to resist being assimilated by exuding all the hate and contempt he can muster. When Jaffar tells the Prince about this, Matton leaps into the being and sacrifices himself, not only destroying the creature, but also causing the angels to revert to their original forms.

Rescued by Yula and Jad, the former captives are taken onboard the Double Triangle 22. Meanwhile, Piel befriends a local creature, a hyponiterix, which accompanies him. Soon afterwards, a patrol cruiser of the Interplanetary Reform catches up with the Double Triangle 22, pursuing the fleeing royals and the treasure Matton stole. Jaffar considers that the rescued spacefarers from Gamma 10 should hijack the Reform cruiser and take it for themselves. During the discussion of this plan, one of the rescued from Gamma 10, Onyx the Digeed of Gnaz, is revealed to be able to change his shape to resemble any object. As a consequence, Onyx will impersonate the missing treasure, allowing the escapees to access the Reformist ship.

Jaffar's vessel is boarded, and as he presents the "captured" pirates and the fake treasure to the Reform commander, none of the Double Triangle 22s crew is able to converse with Piel, who begins to wander without supervision. The crew attempts to contact him, but Piel has lost his transceiver and his hyponiterix companion inside a cave filled with predatory tentacles. Despondent, Piel wanders back to the lakeside, which takes him out of the forest, and he is attacked by the hornets which killed his parents. The Double Triangle 22 closes on her destination, but the planet is being transported through time by a bizarre race of aliens known only as the Masters of Time. Perdide and everything on it, including Piel, is sent back 60 years through time.

The effect of time travel renders the unprotected crew of Double Triangle 22 unconscious. They awake in a vast space-station, where they have been treated, but Silbad is dying. Yula and Jad telepathically discover that Silbad is actually a now-elderly Piel. At the time Perdide was displaced, Piel was nearly killed by the hornets before a passing spacefarer, who was investigating this suddenly appearing planet, came to his rescue; but due to his trauma, Piel lost his childhood memories. Shortly after this revelation, Silbad dies. His funeral in space is attended by one of the Masters of Time; a tall luminous-green biped with a drooping, beak-like snout.

Differences from the novel 
The motion picture story is based on the novel L'Orphelin de Perdide (1958) by the French writer Stefan Wul.

In the original novel, the character of Piel was also named Claude, like his father. Laloux changed this to distinguish father and son.

Cast

Additional English Voices
Ray Brooks

Production 
The BBC (who were co-producers) aired an English-language dubbed version in 1987 and 1991 called Time Masters, featuring, amongst others, the voice of Ray Brooks.

Directed by René Laloux, the film was produced largely at the Pannonia Film Studio in Hungary. The visual design was based on the art of Mœbius, otherwise known as Jean Giraud.

Home media 
Several versions have been released on DVD:
A French edition (ASIN: B00017O6KM, two-disc collectors edition) which was released in 2004 and has no English subtitles.
A German edition (ASIN: B004C5L4X6, single-disc edition) released on 11 November 2010 and another German edition (ASIN: B001I9ZML4, single-disc edition) released on 3 November 2008.
The out-of-print single-disc edition released in the US in 2000 (ASIN: B00004S8A2) is in French with English subtitles.
UK distributor Eureka! released a restored, wide-screen and English-subtitled version of the film as part of its Masters of Cinema series on 22 October 2007.

See also 
 Causal loop
 Lists of animated feature films

References

External links 

 
List of DVD releases

1982 films
1982 animated films
1980s French animated films
Animated films based on novels
Films based on science fiction novels
French animated science fiction films
French independent films
German animated science fiction films
German independent films
Swiss independent films
British animated science fiction films
British independent films
Hungarian animated science fiction films
Hungarian animated films
Hungarian independent films
1980s science fiction films
Space adventure films
Films about time travel
Films directed by René Laloux
Films about orphans
Films based on French novels
Stefan Wul
Films set on fictional planets
1980s French-language films
French-language Swiss films
1980s British films
1980s German films